Yasuj University of Medical Sciences (YUMS) (Persian: دانشگاه علوم پزشکی یاسوج, Danushgah-e 'lum-e Pezeshki-ye Yasuj)  is one of the State Universities of Iran under the supervision of the Ministry of Health and Medical Education in Kohgiluyeh and Boyer-Ahmad province, Iran.

The University has about 177 faculty members and approximately 2,000 students. The University accepts students in medicine, dentistry, paramedical, nursing, midwifery, and healthcare majors, at undergraduate and graduate levels. Admissions are decided by scores earned on an annual national examination.

History 
Yasuj University of Medical Sciences (YUMS) was established as a college in 1990 with the goal of becoming a regional organization for treatment in Kohgiluyeh and Boyer Ahmad. It first enrolled medical students in 1995 from the national entrance examination. In September 1995, after three years as an Institute, the organization was promoted to Yasuj University of Medical Sciences.

Campus 
The campus is composed of the University Management Complex, the School of Public Health and the New University Campus. The New University Campus is located near Imam Sajjad Educational Hospital and includes the School of Medicine, the School of Nursing and Midwifery, the School of Paramedicine, and the School of Dentistry. The sports gym, University mosque, and girls' dormitories are also located near the central campus.

Schools 
 School of Medicine
 School of Dentistry
 School of Nursing and Midwifery
 School of Health
 School of Paramedicine

Research centers

Medicinal Plant Research Center 
The Medicinal Plant Research Center was the University's first Research Center and was approved in 2007. Dena peaks in the South zone is located in the Dena district. The Boyer Ahmad district is considered a natural museum of medicinal plants. Diversity in this region is unparalleled and Iran's unique genetic resources help support this center. The center examines the advantages, disadvantages, and properties of medicinal plants for the treatment and preparation of cosmetics and health.

Social Determinants of Health Research Center 
The Social Determinants of Health Research Center was established in the Department of Health in February 2011. Its purpose is to investigate the social determinants of health and basic needs.

Molecular Cellular Research Center 
The Cellular-Molecular Research Center is an academic research center. Established in 2010, the center serves as a framework for both professor and graduate student research projects in medicine and other fields.

The center's laboratory facilities are specialized for the implementation and promotion of research projects in the fields of cellular and molecular biology.

Provincial Health Networks 
1.     Dena Health Network

2.     Bahmaee Health Network

3.     Boyer-Ahmad Health Network

4.     Kohgiluyeh Health Network

5.     Gachsaran Health Network

6.     Basht Health Network

7.     Choram Health Network

Official Website 
English Website

Persian Website (فارسی)

References 

Medical schools in Iran
Universities in Iran